Phalon Anton Alexander, (born April 15, 1969), professionally known as Jazze Pha, is an American record producer, singer, songwriter and rapper from Memphis, Tennessee. He is the founder and chief executive officer of Sho'nuff Records, to which American R&B singer-songwriter Ciara was signed.

Early life
Jazze Pha was born and raised in Memphis, Tennessee. His father is James Alexander, bassist for the Bar-Kays, an influential group on the Memphis soul scene in the 1960s. His mother, Denise Williams, is an accomplished singer, having worked with everyone from Earth, Wind, and Fire to Barbra Streisand. Pha was named after the late Phalon Jones, another member of the Bar-Kays, who died in the December 10, 1967, plane crash that also killed three other Bar-Kays members and Otis Redding.

Career
Pha is known for announcing "Ladies and gentlemen" or "This is a Jazze Phizzle product-shizzle!", both at the beginning and, occasionally, at the end of songs on which he is featured. In 1990, Pha was signed to Elektra Records.

Discography

Guest appearances

References

External links
 
 
 
 
 

African-American record producers
African-American male rappers
20th-century African-American people
American male singers
American double-bassists
Male double-bassists
American hip hop record producers
American hip hop singers
American music industry executives
American rhythm and blues keyboardists
Atlantic Records artists
Businesspeople from Atlanta
Businesspeople from Tennessee
Living people
Rappers from Memphis, Tennessee
Rappers from Atlanta
Songwriters from Georgia (U.S. state)
Songwriters from Tennessee
Southern hip hop musicians
21st-century American rappers
21st-century double-bassists
21st-century American male musicians
1969 births
African-American songwriters
21st-century African-American musicians
American male songwriters